Maman Brigitte (English: Mother Brigitte) sometimes also written as Manman Brigitte and also known by Gran Brigitte, Grann Brigitte, Manman, Manman Brigit, and Maman Brijit is a death loa (or lwa) and the consort of Baron Samedi in Haitian Vodou. She drinks rum infused with hot peppers and is symbolized by a black rooster. Maman Brigitte protects graves in Haitian cemeteries that are marked by the cross of Baron Samedi. Graves that are protected by Brigitte are marked by a mound of stones. In Vodou practice, the first burials serve as offerings to either Baron Samedi or Maman Brigitte depending on the gender of the person being laid to rest. If the deceased person is male then the grave is dedicated to Baron Samedi; if the deceased person is female then the grave is dedicated to Maman Brigitte.

Like Samedi and the Guede, she is foul-mouthed.  She is also the adoptive mother of Guede Nibo.

Due to the religious persecution of enslaved African and Caribbean people in Haiti and the Americas, Maman Brigitte was disguised via syncretism and represented by various saints, usually those depicted with fire or snakes, including Brigid of Kildare and, less frequently, Mary Magdalene.

In other media

Video games 

 In the game Cyberpunk 2077, there is a character named Maman Brigitte who comes from Haiti that leads the gang, the Voodoo Boys.

See also
Ọya

References

Further reading 
Laënnec Hurbon, Voodoo: Search for the Spirit, "Abrams Discoveries" series. Harry N. Abrams, Inc. (1995)

Death goddesses
Haitian Vodou goddesses
Health goddesses
Justice goddesses
Vengeance goddesses
Voodoo goddesses